The Cameroon bus attack occurred on January 1, 2015, when Boko Haram militants hijacked a bus near Koza, Cameroon.

The vehicle was travelling between Kousseri and Maroua in the Far North province of Cameroon, but the hijackers chose to drive it to the Nigerian border instead. Between 15 and 25 people were killed in the attack, and at least 10 were wounded.

References

Bus attacks in 2015
Terrorist incidents in Cameroon in 2015
Massacres perpetrated by Boko Haram
Mass murder in 2015
Islamic terrorist incidents in 2015
January 2015 crimes in Africa